This is a list of crossings of the South Saskatchewan River in the Canadian provinces of Saskatchewan and Alberta, from the river's confluence with the North Saskatchewan River at Saskatchewan River Forks, upstream to its origin at the confluence of the Bow and Oldman Rivers.

Saskatchewan

Alberta

Pipeline bridge 

Proposed crossings 
The city of Medicine Hat hosted a public meeting proposing a Sanitary Sewer and Water Pipeline which is intended to cross the South Saskatchewan River.

See also 
List of crossings of the North Saskatchewan River

References 

 
 

South Saskatchewan River